Wonder Lake State Park is a  Putnam County state park located in Patterson, New York.

History
 Wonder Lake was constructed in the 1930s as part of a series of improvements to the property by A. L. Cushman, who owned a chain of bakeries in New York City. The smaller Laurel Pond,  in size, was also formed after the construction of a dam was completed during the same time period.

The core of Wonder Lake State Park was the summer home of television star Elizabeth Montgomery prior to her death in 1995.

The New York State Office of Parks, Recreation and Historic Preservation acquired the  Wonder Lake property in November 1998 using Clean Water/Clean Air Bond Act funds. Prior to the  purchase, the tract was surrounded by private property with no public access.

Park's description
As of 2013, Wonder Lake State Park contained  of trails, including the Highlands Trail, which passes Laurel Pond and encircles Wonder Lake. Four other trails cover much of the northern, central and western areas of the park.

Wonder Lake State Park serves to protect portions of the Great Swamp watershed, and serves as a link with other public lands in the area.

See also 
List of New York state parks

References

External links 
 New York State Parks: Wonder Lake State Park
 New York-New Jersey Trail Conference: Wonder Lake State Park details and trail information
 NY – NJ – CT Botany Online: Hiking Wonder Lake State Park
 Town of Patterson: State Preserves: Wonder Lake State Park

State parks of New York (state)
Parks in Putnam County, New York
Protected areas established in 1998
1998 establishments in New York (state)